Pea mild mosaic virus (PmiMV) is a plant pathogenic virus of the family Comoviridae.

External links
Family Groups—The Baltimore Method

Viral plant pathogens and diseases
Comoviruses